Keitha Rachelle Adams (born February 13, 1967) is an American college basketball coach who is currently the head women's basketball coach at Wichita State.

Prior to the 2006–07 season, Adams was known as Keitha Green.

Coaching career
Adams began her coaching career in 1987 as a girls' basketball assistant coach at Belle Plaine High School in Belle Plaine, Kansas while studying at Southwestern College, from which she would ultimately graduate in 1989. After graduating from Southwestern, Adams joined Winfield High School in Winfield, Kansas and coached softball, volleyball, and track before ultimately settling on basketball full-time in 1991.

In 1994, Adams became a women's basketball  assistant coach at Independence Community College; she was also a men's and women's tennis coach in the 1994–95 season. Independence promoted Adams to head coach in 1996. In five seasons as head coach, Adams had a cumulative 127–37 record and two Kansas Jayhawk Community College Conference titles in 2000 and 2001.

UTEP (2001–2017)
The University of Texas at El Paso (UTEP) hired Adams as head women's basketball coach on April 20, 2001. Adams coached at UTEP for 16 seasons and accumulated a 284–209 record, three Conference USA regular season titles (2008, 2012, 2016), one C-USA Tournament title (2012), two NCAA tournament appearances (2008 and 2012), and two WNIT appearances (2014 and 2016)—the only such titles and postseason bids in program history.

Following a 24–7 season in 2013–14 and appearance in the 2014 WNIT, UTEP signed Adams to a six-year contract extension.

In her final season as head coach, UTEP went 8–23 season in 2016–17.

At UTEP, Adams created a mentorship program that helped ensure a high graduation rate among her players. Adams is credited with building a successful women's basketball program that also "encourages interaction between players and fans." She was inducted into the El Paso Women's Hall of Fame in 2010. In 2016, she was recognized as the Conference USA Coach of the Year.

Wichita State (2017–present)
Adams resigned from UTEP to become head coach at Wichita State on March 29, 2017.

Head coaching record
The following table shows Adams' head coaching record at the NCAA Division I level. Source:

References

External links 
 Wichita State biography
 UTEP biography 

1967 births
Living people
Basketball coaches from Kansas
Basketball players from Kansas
High school basketball coaches in Kansas
Junior college women's basketball coaches in the United States
Junior college women's basketball players in the United States
People from Sumner County, Kansas
Southwestern College (Kansas) alumni
UTEP Miners women's basketball coaches
Wichita State Shockers women's basketball coaches